Events from the year 1770 in art.

Events
 Anne Vallayer-Coster is admitted to the Académie royale de peinture et de sculpture at the age of twenty-six.

Works

 Thomas Gainsborough – approximate date
 The Blue Boy
 Thomas Linley
 Sir Joshua Reynolds – Colonel Acland and Lord Sydney: The Archers
 Alexander Roslin
 Portrait of the artist's wife (Marie-Suzanne Giroust)
 Portrait of Prince Frederick Adolf of Sweden
 George Stubbs
 A Horse Frightened by a Lion (Walker Art Gallery, Liverpool)
 A Lion Attacking a Horse (Yale University Art Gallery)
 Giovanni Domenico Tiepolo – The Immaculate Conception with Saint Lawrence and Saint Francis of Paola (approximate date)
 Benjamin West – The Death of General Wolfe

Births
 January 13 – Anatole Devosge, French painter (died 1850)
 February 12 – Jean-Jacques Karpff, French painter, designer and miniaturist (died 1829)
 February 21 – Antonio Pasini, Italian painter and manuscript illuminator (died 1845)
 March 12 – Karl August Senff, Baltic German painter, engraver and teacher (died 1838)
 c. March 25 – Alexander Carse, Scottish genre painter (died 1843)
 April 12 – George Clint, English portrait painter and engraver (died 1854)
 April 18 – Ludwig Buchhorn, German painter and engraver (died 1856)
 May 4 – François Gérard, Italian-born French painter (died 1837)
 June 1 – Michael Sigismund Frank, glass painter (died 1847)
 July 3 – Thomas Pardoe, English enameler noted for flower painting (died 1823)
 October 18 – Thomas Phillips, English portrait and subject painter (died 1845)
 November 15 – Louis Lafitte, French painter, designer, illustrator and muralist (died 1828)
 November 19 – Bertel Thorvaldsen, Danish sculptor (died 1844)
 November 30 – John Buckler, British draughtsman and engraver (died 1851)
 date unknown
 Robert Cromek, English  engraver, editor, art dealer and entrepreneur (died 1812)
 Jean-Baptiste-Joseph Duchesne, French painter and miniaturist (died 1856)
 Richard Duppa, English writer and a draughtsman (died 1831)
 Julien-Joseph Ducorron, Belgian landscape painter (died 1848)
 Johann Christian Eberlein, German painter (died 1815)
 Johannes Jelgerhuis, painter and actor from the Northern Netherlands (died 1836)
 Marie-Élisabeth Laville-Leroux, French painter (died 1826)
 John Lewin, English-born Australian artist (died 1819)
 Charles Balthazar Julien Févret de Saint-Mémin, portraitist and museum director (died 1852)
 1765/1770: Fryderyk Bauman, Polish architect and sculptor-decorator (died 1845)

Deaths
 January 2 – Joseph Anton Feuchtmayer, German Rococo stuccoist and sculptor (born 1696)
 January 8 – John Michael Rysbrack, Flemish sculptor (born 1694)
 February 17 – Louis René Vialy, French painter (born 1680)
 March 5 – Gaetano Chiaveri, Italian Baroque architect and master builder, most notable for his work as part of the second phase of the Dresden Baroque (born 1689)
 March 23 – Martin van Meytens, Austrian portrait painter (born 1695)
 March 27
 José Ramírez de Arellano, Spanish Baroque architect and sculptor (born 1705)
 Giovanni Battista Tiepolo, Italian painter (born 1696)
 May 30 – François Boucher, French painter (born 1703)
 July 7 – Suzuki Harunobu, Japanese woodblock print artist, one of the most famous in the Ukiyo-e style (born 1724)
 July 16 – Francis Cotes, English painter (born 1726)
 November 1 – Gaspare Traversi, Italian painter (born c.1722)
 December 1 – Giambettino Cignaroli, Italian painter (born 1718)
 December 24 – Pierre-Philippe Mignot, French sculptor (born 1715)
 date unknown
 Guillaume Philippe Benoist, French line engraver (born 1725)
 Domenico Duprà, Italian rococo court painter (born 1689)
 Isabel Jolís Oliver, Spanish printer and engraver  (born 1682)
 Giuseppe Pedretti, Italian painter of lunettes and altarpieces (born 1694)
 Maria Felice Tibaldi, Italian painter (born 1707)  
 probable
 Apollonio Domenichini, Italian painter of vedute, active in Venice, between 1740 and 1770 (born 1715)
 Susanna Drury, Irish painter chiefly noted for her watercolor drawings (born 1698)
 Dimitrije Bačević, Serbian icon painter and muralist (born 1735).

References

 
Years of the 18th century in art
1770s in art